Amer El-Hanafi (born 16 December 1934) is an Egyptian weightlifter. He competed at the 1960 Summer Olympics and the 1964 Summer Olympics.

References

1934 births
Living people
Egyptian male weightlifters
Olympic weightlifters of Egypt
Weightlifters at the 1960 Summer Olympics
Weightlifters at the 1964 Summer Olympics
Sportspeople from Cairo
20th-century Egyptian people
21st-century Egyptian people